is a Japanese gunka song composed by Yūji Koseki with lyrics by Kīchirō Yabūchi. The song was released by Nippon Columbia in October 1938.

History

In the wake of the outbreak of the Second Sino-Japanese War in July 1937, demand for patriotic songs to boost public and military morale swelled in Japan. Newspapers regularly held competitions calling for submissions from the public of songs and song lyrics. The lyrics for Roei no Uta were chosen in such a fashion, after a contest jointly held by the Tokyo Nichi Nichi Shimbun and Osaka Mainichi Shimbun. The jury, which included the writer Kan Kikuchi and the poet Hakushū Kitahara, awarded Kīchirō Yabūchi's Roei no Uta as the winning entry. The 28-year-old composer Yūji Koseki was chosen to set the lyrics to music.

Nippon Columbia recorded the song soon after with singers Tadaharu Nakano, Akira Matsudaira, Noboru Kirishima, Hisao Itō, and Akira Sasaki performing, backed by the Nippon Columbia house orchestra under the direction of the composer.

The song became one of the most famous gunka in Japan, establishing Yūji Koseki at the forefront of Japanese composers of the era.

References

Japanese songs
Japanese-language songs
Japanese patriotic songs
1930s songs